The 1988 United States presidential election in Idaho took place on November 8, 1988. All 50 states and the District of Columbia, were part of the 1988 United States presidential election. State voters chose four electors to the Electoral College, which selected the president and vice president.

Idaho was won by incumbent United States Vice President George H. W. Bush of Texas, who was running against Massachusetts Governor Michael Dukakis. Bush ran with Indiana Senator Dan Quayle as Vice President, and Dukakis ran with Texas Senator Lloyd Bentsen.

The election was very partisan for Idaho, with over 98% of the electorate voting for either the Democratic or Republican parties, and only four parties appearing on the ballot. All but one county gave either Dukakis or Bush an outright majority; the exception was Bonner County, which gave Bush a very narrow plurality. Bush's best county was Madison County, which gave him 84.87% of its vote--Bush's second-strongest county performance in the nation after the famous Unionist Republican bastion of Jackson County in Kentucky. Dukakis' best county was Shoshone County, where he received 60.49% of the vote.

, this is the last election in which Blaine County voted for a Republican presidential candidate.

Idaho weighed in for this election as 18% more Republican than the national average and with 62.08% of the popular vote. As a result, Idaho became the third-most Republican state in the nation, behind Utah and New Hampshire.

Bush won Idaho by a powerful 26.1% margin; his 62.1% vote share made it his third-best state in the nation, after Utah and New Hampshire. The Mountain West as a whole had begun trending Republican from 1952 on, after having been a swing region that was critical to Democratic victories when they did occur between 1896 and 1948. However, the realignment was particularly pronounced in Idaho; in 1964, a mere 16 years after having backed Truman over Dewey, Idaho came within less than 2% of voting for Barry Goldwater, far closer than any other state in the region apart from Goldwater's native Arizona and indeed far closer than any other Johnson state anywhere apart from Florida.

In 1988, an election influenced by the 1980s farm crisis, several Mountain States (most notably Colorado and Montana) were shakier than usual in their support for the Republican ticket, but Idaho remained not only in the Republican column, but far more Republican than the nation overall. Bush dominated almost all of rural Idaho, and also scored strong wins in the population centers of Ada County (Boise), Canyon County (Nampa), Bonneville County (Idaho Falls), and Twin Falls County (Twin Falls), in all of which he exceeded 60% of the vote. He also won, albeit less powerfully, the other two of Idaho's six largest counties, Bannock (Pocatello) and Kootenai (Coeur d'Alene). However, Dukakis did manage to carry a cluster of counties in North Idaho, centered on the Silver Valley, a region historically dominated by mining. This made Dukakis the first Democrat to carry any counties in the Gem State since 1976, and made Bush the first Republican to win the White House without carrying Latah County since William McKinley in 1896, as well as the first to do so without carrying Clearwater, Lewis, Nez Perce, or Shoshone Counties since Richard Nixon in 1968.

Results

Results by county

See also
 United States presidential elections in Idaho
 Presidency of George H. W. Bush

References

Idaho
1988
1988 Idaho elections